Springville is a census-designated place in Tazewell County, Virginia. It is the midpoint between Bluefield and Tazewell on US 460 and US 19. The population as of the 2010 census was 1,371.

Springville is home to several churches including Destiny Outreach Ministries and Springville Christian Church which is peoported to be the oldest congregation in Tazewell County.

The Bluestone River rises in the Springville area on East River Mountain.

References

Census-designated places in Tazewell County, Virginia
Census-designated places in Virginia